is a platform party game, part of the Super Monkey Ball game series. It was developed for the Nintendo 3DS handheld game console. Players can either use the Circle Pad or the internal gyroscope of the Nintendo 3DS to navigate AiAi and the others so they can collect as many bananas as possible within the time limit as in previous games in the series.

Gameplay
Super Monkey Ball 3D supports three full-featured gameplay modes: traditional Super Monkey Ball puzzles, "Monkey Race" in which players race each other in frantic car battles, and "Monkey Fight" in which players fight each other in manic brawls. The latter two modes, Monkey Race and Monkey Fight, can be played via wireless connection with up to four players locally.

It was originally released on March 3, 2011 in Japan. It was later released as a launch title on March 25, March 27 and March 31 of the same year in Europe, North America and Australia, respectively. Sega has also released the game as the downloadable title for the Nintendo eShop in Europe and North America on April 3, 2014.

Reception

The game received mixed reviews. Audrey Drake of IGN gave the game 7.5/10, praising the gameplay and story, but she criticized Monkey Race for being a "rip-off of Mario Kart with clunky controls", and Monkey Fight for "being a rip-off of Super Smash Bros. with clunky controls". Chris Schilling of Eurogamer gave the game a 4/10. Review aggregator Metacritic gave the game 55/100 based on 57 reviews.

Notes

References

External links
 Official Super Monkey Ball 3D U.S. website
 Official Super Monkey Ball 3D Japanese website

2011 video games
3D platform games
Flight simulation video games
Multiplayer and single-player video games
Nintendo 3DS eShop games
Nintendo 3DS games
Nintendo 3DS-only games
Sega video games
3D
Video game sequels
Video games scored by Hideki Naganuma
Video games developed in Japan